Coco is a women's perfume by French fashion house Chanel, introduced in 1984. It was created by Chanel in-house perfumer Jacques Polge.

Marketing 
In 1991, French actress, model and singer Vanessa Paradis starred in a commercial for the fragrance covered in black feathers, portraying a bird swinging in a cage. The advert, entitled "L'esprit de Chanel" ("The spirit of Chanel"), was shot by Jean-Paul Goude.

References 

Perfumes
Chanel perfumes
Products introduced in 1984